Ciel (meaning heaven or sky in French) or CIEL may refer to:

People
 Ciel (Canadian DJ), a Canadian DJ and electronic musician

Companies and organizations
 Ciel (beverage) a bottled water brand owned by The Coca-Cola Company
 Ciel (company), developer of the visual novel After...
 CIEL-FM, radio station in Quebec, Canada.
 Ciel Satellite Group
 CIEL UK, Le Centre International d'Etudes Liturgiques-UK
 Center for International Environmental Law

Fiction
 Ciel: The Last Autumn Story, a fantasy manhwa by Rhim Ju-yeon
 Ciel a vampire hunter in the visual novel, anime and manga Tsukihime, as well as the game Melty Blood
 Ciel, a character in the Mega Man Zero games
 Ciel Phantomhive, the main character in the manga and anime Black Butler
 Ciel Kirahoshi (Kirarin), a character in the anime series Kirakira PreCure a la Mode
 Ciel Sousa, a character in Sophie Labelle's webcomic Assigned Male and the spinoff novel Ciel
 Ciel City, a place in Little Airplane Wissie, early development version of Super Wings

Other uses
 Ciel (footballer), Brazilian professional footballer
 Ciel, Saône-et-Loire, a commune of the Saône-et-Loire département, in France
 Cadillac Ciel, an American full-size convertible concept car
 Ciel, a tincture in heraldry also called bleu celeste or celeste (sky-blue)